Étoile du Congo is a Congolese football club based in Brazzaville.

History
L'Étoile du Congo started as a team in the Fédération Athlétique Congolaise (FAC), a league run by Catholic missionaries in the Belgian Congo. The church provided clothes and shoes and the team was required to attend mass. The team, known at the time as Renaissance, won the Brazzaville city championship each year from 1945 to 1950 led by team-captain Dominique Sombo. They played at Eboué stadium, which was owned by the mission.

Controversy
The players, being colonized, were not compensate at all for their efforts. The mission would collect money at the gates, and did not pay for medical treatment
or transport to games. In 1951, the players decided to write to the Director of Social Services to request to leave the mission and to be sponsored by a cultural center. After threatening to boycott colonial administrators assuaged their demands to avoid popular outcry. Renaissance won another city championship and independence from the FAC. To celebrate their new autonomy, the team changed their name to L'Étoile, in respect to a star Brazzaville team from the 1930s. The name Renaissance was given to reserve team of younger players.

Honours
Congo Premier League: 11
1967, 1978, 1979, 1980, 1983, 1985, 1987, 1989, 2000, 2001, 2006.

Coupe du Congo: 6
1983, 1995, 2000, 2002, 2006, 2019.

Super Coupe du Congo: 1
2019.

Performance in CAF competitions
CAF Champions League: 3 appearances
2001 – Second Round
2002 – Second Round
2007 – Second Round

African Cup of Champions Clubs: 8 appearances

1968 – First Round
1979 – Second Round
1980 – Quarter-finals

1982 – First Round
1988 – First Round
1990 – Second Round

1993 – First Round
1995 – First Round

CAF Confederation Cup: 2 appearances
2007 – Second Round of 16
2015 – Preliminary Round

CAF Cup: 1 appearance
1992 – Second Round

CAF Cup Winners' Cup: 3 appearances
1996 – First Round
2000 – Quarter-finals
2003 – Second Round

Current squad

References

Football clubs in the Republic of the Congo
Sports clubs in Brazzaville